The redfin danio resembles a zebra danio with blood-red fins. It may be a colour morph of the orange-finned zebra danio, Danio kyathit.

See also
Danio
Danionins

External links
Danio sp. "redfin"

References

Danios